A suprapubic cystostomy or suprapubic catheter (SPC) (also known as a vesicostomy or epicystostomy) is a surgically created connection between the urinary bladder and the skin used to drain urine from the bladder in individuals with obstruction of normal urinary flow. The connection does not go through the abdominal cavity.

Urinary flow may be blocked by swelling of the prostate (benign prostatic hypertrophy), traumatic disruption of the urethra, congenital defects of the urinary tract, or by obstructions such as kidney stones passed into the urethra, and cancer. It is also a common treatment used among spinal cord injury patients who are unable or unwilling to use intermittent catheterization to empty the bladder, and cannot otherwise void due to detrusor sphincter dyssynergia.

Initially, a thin tube (catheter) is placed through the skin just above the pubic bone into the bladder, often with the assistance of ultrasound imaging. This catheter initially remains in place for up to a month while the tissue around it scars and forms a tract (sinus) between the bladder and the body exterior. After the formation of scar tissue is complete, the catheter is replaced periodically in order to help prevent infection.

Medical uses
 Failed urethral catheter,
 Long term usage (if left in urethral long terms catheters can lead to acquired hypospadias and recurrent/chronic UTIs, urinary tract infections).

Contraindications
 Need to rule out bladder cancer in cases of clot retention
 Lower abdominal incisions with likelihood of adhesions
 Pelvic fracture

Complications
 UTIs
 Blockage
 Bladder stones
 Bladder cancer
 Bypass track by urine

Society and culture
The "suprapubic cystotomy" is a specialty of the fictional physician Stephen Maturin in Patrick O'Brian's twenty-one volume series on the Royal Navy during the Napoleonic era. In modern medical terminology, "cystotomy" without the "s" refers to any surgical incision or puncture into the bladder, such as to remove urinary calculi or to perform tissue repair and reconstruction. "Cystostomy" is surgery specifically to provide drainage.

See also 
 List of surgeries by type
 Bonanno catheter, originally designed for suprapubic cystostomy

References

External links
 Cystostomy description
 Vesicostomy care of infants and children

Urologic surgery
Catheters